Lacinipolia laudabilis, the laudable arches moth, is a moth of the family Noctuidae. It is found in the United States, where it has been recorded from Alabama, California, Florida, Georgia, Kentucky, Maryland, North Carolina, Oklahoma, Massachusetts, Pennsylvania, South Carolina, Tennessee, Texas and Virginia. It is also found in Mexico and Costa Rica. It has been recorded from Great Britain, where it was probably accidentally imported, but it might also be a rare immigrant.

The wingspan is 20–28 mm. Adults have been recorded on wing year round.

The larvae feed on various herbaceous plants.

References

Moths described in 1868
Orthosiini